10 Park Street (also known as the E.M. Clark House) is a historic house located in Methuen, Massachusetts. The house was added to the National Register of Historic Places on January 20, 1984.

Description and history 
It is a -story wood-frame structure, with clapboard siding and a front-gable roof. The front facade is two bays wide, with a two-story projecting bay on the left, and the main entrance on the right, topped by a decorative hood.  The gables and eaves are decorated by paired brackets.

The E. M. Clark House built around 1880 is a well-preserved Italianate style single family residences, most closely associated with the development of Methuen during the post-war expansion to service the local mills. E. M. Clark, an early resident, listed his occupation as a shoe manufacturer.

See also
 National Register of Historic Places listings in Methuen, Massachusetts
 National Register of Historic Places listings in Essex County, Massachusetts

References

Houses in Methuen, Massachusetts
National Register of Historic Places in Methuen, Massachusetts
Houses on the National Register of Historic Places in Essex County, Massachusetts
Italianate architecture in Massachusetts